Nor Shamsiah binti Mohd Yunus (born 1964) is the Governor of the Central Bank of Malaysia from 1 July 2018, replacing Tan Sri Muhammad bin Ibrahim. She has served as Deputy Governor of Bank Negara from 2010 to 2013 and from 2013 to 2016. Later, she joined the International Monetary Fund as Assistant Director of the Financial and Capital Markets Division.

She is the second woman to be appointed as Governor of the National Bank after Tan Sri Dr Zeti Akhtar Aziz.

Education 
She holds a Bachelor of Arts degree in Accounting from the University of South Australia and is a chartered accountant (CPA).

Career

Bank Negara Malaysia 
She has been in working at Bank Negara Malaysia since 1987. In 1999, she was appointed Director of the Bank's Regulation Department until 2004. On 1 December 2004 she was appointed Assistant Governor of Bank Negara Malaysia. She has served as the Deputy Governor of the Central Bank twice, namely in 2010-2013 and 2013–2016. She was finally appointed as Governor of Bank Negara Malaysia from 1 July 2018.

Assignment at Bank Negara Malaysia 
She has been in charge of financial development, strategic human resource management, organizational development transformation, prudent regulatory formation, bank regulatory and regulatory rules, crisis management and insurance.

Other career experience 

 Assistant Director of the Finance and Capital Markets Division, the International Monetary Fund (IMF).
 Managing Director, Danamodal Nasional Berhad
 EPF Investment Panel Member
 Tabung Haji Investment Board member

Contributions 
She was directly involved in the settlement of the 1998 Asian Financial Crisis. Playing an important role also in the formulation of the Financial Sector Masterplan (2001-2010) and the Financial Sector Roadmap (2011-2020).

Honours

Honours of Malaysia
  :
  Commander of the Order of Loyalty to the Crown of Malaysia (PSM) – Tan Sri (2020)
  :
  Knight Commander of the Order of the Territorial Crown (PMW) – Datuk (2012)

See also 
 Governor of the Central Bank of Malaysia

References 

1964 births
Living people
Governors of the Central Bank of Malaysia
Malaysian Muslims
Malaysian women
Commanders of the Order of Loyalty to the Crown of Malaysia